Faruk Adamu Kuta is a Nigerian academic who is currently a vice chancellor of Federal University of Technology Minna (FUTMinna).

Education 
Kuta graduated from Usman Danfodiyo University, Sokoto from department of Microbiology, he continued with MTech. in Pharmaceutical Microbiology at the same university. He then completed his PhD in Medical Microbiology at Abubakar Tafawa Balewa University, Bauchi, Bauchi.

References 

1973 births
Living people